Clinacanthus nutans is a species of plant in the family Acanthaceae. It is also known by the common names belalai gajah (Malay), phaya yo (Thai), Sabah snake grass, ki tajam (Sunda), and dandang gendis (Jawa). This plant is used in the traditional herbal medicines of Malaysia, Indonesia, Thailand, and China. It has been used in Indonesia in the treatment of dysentery and diabetes.

Description
Its stems are green, woody, upright and cylindrical.

Medicinal uses
It is used in treating  skin rashes, insects and snake bites, lesions caused by herpes simplex virus, diabetes, and gout in Malaysia, Indonesia, Thailand and China.

External links
Clinacanthus nutans at GlobInMed

References

Acanthaceae
Plants described in 1768
Taxa named by Nicolaas Laurens Burman